Gyula Tóth (10 June 1901 – 22 April 1936) was a Hungarian footballer. He played in five matches for the Hungary national football team between 1922 and 1924.

References

External links
 

1901 births
1936 deaths
Hungarian footballers
Hungary international footballers
Sportspeople from Székesfehérvár
Association football midfielders
Footballers at the 1924 Summer Olympics
Olympic footballers of Hungary